Orissaare Parish was municipality in Saare County, Estonia. The municipality had a population of 2,116 (as of 1 January 2007) and covered an area of 163.02 km².

During the administrative-territorial reform in 2017, all 12 municipalities on the island Saaremaa were merged into a single municipality – Saaremaa Parish.

Settlements
Small borough
Orissaare
Villages
Ariste - Arju - Haapsu - Hindu - Imavere - Jaani - Järveküla - Kalma - Kareda - Kavandi - Kõinastu - Kuninguste - Laheküla - Liigalaskma - Liiva - Maasi - Mäeküla - Mehama - Ööriku - Orinõmme - Põripõllu - Pulli - Randküla - Rannaküla - Raugu - Saikla - Salu - Suur-Pahila - Suur-Rahula - Taaliku - Tagavere - Tumala - Väike-Pahila - Väike-Rahula - Väljaküla - Võhma

Gallery

See also
Municipalities of Estonia

References